Bharanikkavu is a Panchayat in Alappuzha district in the Indian state of Kerala. The Village by the same name is a part of it.
The name is derived from the historic Bharanikkavu Devi temple situated here.

Demographics
The 2001 Census of India found that Bharanikkavu had a population of 15715, with 7374 males and 8341 females.

Constituent Regions
 Bharanikkavu
 Pallickal
 Vetticode
 Kattanam
 Mankuzhy
 Choonadu
 Kattachira

Fast Growing Constituent Region
Kattanam

Educational Institutions & Libraries
Library:
Grameena Grandhasala, Bharanickavu

Subhash Grandha Parayana Sala, Koickal Jn. Pallickal

Colleges:
 St. Thomas Nursing college, Vetticode
 Maha Guru College of Engineering, Kattachira, Pallickal

Schools:
 Sree Nagaraja Vilasam U. P. School (NRVUPS), Vetticode
 Sree Nagaraja School (CBSE), Vetticode
 Mar Thoma UP School, Kattanam
 St thomas Mar Thoma  High School 
 St.Thomas Senior Secondary School, Kattanam
 F. G. M. M. L. P. School, Bharanickavu (South)
 Kattachira L. P. School, Kattachira
 Captain N. P. Pillai Memorial Higher Secondary School, Kattachira
 Mahakavi Kumaranasan Central School, Pallickal, Naduvilemuri
 Government UP School, Moonamkutty
 Pope Pius XI High School, Kattanam
 C.M.S. High School, Pallickal
 Government L.P. School, Pallickal Naduvilemuri
 Government U.P. School, Bharanikkavu
 Veda Vyasa Vidya Peedom, Kattanam
 C.M.S. L.P. School Monkuzhy
 Gayathri Central School, Mankuzhy, Moonamkutti
Education Related:
 Kerala University Information Center, Moonamkutty, Pallickal
Training Centres:
 Karuna InfoStudies, Pallimukku, Kattanam

Religious Harmony & Festivals

The Temples of Bharanikkavu, the Churches of Kattanam, the Mosque in Choonad and the Budha statues represent the religious harmony of the panchayat.

Temples
 Bharanikkavu Devi Temple, Bharanikkavu
 Shri Nagaraja Temple, Vetticode
 Mahavishnu Temple, Kattachira
 Muttakkulam Devi Temple, Kattachira
 Karimuttathu Devi Temple, Mankuzhy
 Arekara Devi Temple, Kattachira
 Cheruvilathu Sri Mannadi Bhagavathi Temple
 Poovathoor Sastha Temple, Ilippakulam
 Panickasheril Shiva Temple, Kattachira
 Pallipuram Devi Temple, Kattanam, Vettikode
 Valliya Veedu Devi Temple, Kattanam
 MannadiKuttiyil Devi Temple, Kattanam
 Orukuzhiyil Saktheesha Temple, Kattanam
 Nadayil Kuttiyil (AYICKATTU) Sree Bhadra Devi Temple, Pallickal
 Mannachirethu Puthenkavil Sree Bhadra Bhagavathi Temple, Kattanam, Nambukulangara
 Kattachira Tharal thekkathil Shri Nagaraja Temple
ValiyavedU Devi Temple Kattanam
 Konathu Devi Temple, Manjadithara
 Mandaykkattu Devi Temple (Kochambalam), Pallickal
 Padikal Panthaplavil Devi Temple, Bharanickavu South
 Mahalekshmi Devi Temple, 
  Manjadithara
Chirayil devi temple, Kurathikadu

Churches
 St. Stephen's Orthodox Church, Kattanam
 Malankara Catholic Church, Kattanam
 St. Thomas Marthoma Church, Kattanam
St.Thomas Marthoma Church, Pallickal
 St. James CSI Church, Kattanam
 CSI Church, Vetticodu
 Catholic Church, Achamkutty
 CSI Christ Church Monkuzhy
 The Pentecost Mission, Bharanickavu

Festivals
 The Ashwathi Mahotsavom & Koottamkottu @ Muttakkulam Devi Temple held in Kumbham  every Year 
 The Meenabharani Mahotsavom of Bharanikkavu Devi Temple, the associated Noottonnu Kalam and Ezhunnallathu.
 The Aayillya Pooja and Ezhunnallathu of Shri Nagaraja Temple, Vetticode.
 The Perunnal at the St. Stephen's Orthodox Church, Kattanam.
 Pathamudaya Mahothsavam of Pallipuram Devi Temple.
 Uthrdam Thirunnal Mahotsavom at Nadayil Kuttiyil Sree Bhadra Devi Temple in Meenam.
bharanikkavu devi temple other festivals.
1. Meena Bharani Pongaala
2. Sivarathri Maholtsavam
3. Navarathri Mandapa Utsavam
4. Vruchika Chirappu
5. Ashtamirohini Uriyati
 Rohini Mahotsavom @ Mahalekshmi Temple Manjadithara

Monuments and Historic Significance

The statue of Buddha housed and worshiped at the Bharanikkavu Temple where is a protected monument under the Department of Archaeology.

References

Villages in Alappuzha district